North Bonnevoie-Verlorenkost is a quarter in southern Luxembourg City, in southern Luxembourg.  Within the quarter lies some of the area of Bonnevoie, most of which lies in the quarter of South Bonnevoie.

, the quarter has a population of 4,376 inhabitants.

References

Quarters of Luxembourg City